Robert F. LaPrade is a  knee surgeon, practicing at Twin Cities Orthopedics in Edina, Minnesota. He is a specialist  in  treating posterolateral knee injuries. He has received the  2013 OREF Clinical Research Award for his research in improving outcomes for these injuries, and is the author of a textbook on the subject.

Education 
LaPrade attended the University of Maine in Orono, ME and received his Bachelor of Science degree in Forest engineering in 1981. He completed his medical degree at the University of Illinois at Chicago in 1987 and his medical internship at Michigan State University in 1988. LaPrade's medical residency was also completed at Michigan State University/Kalamazoo Center for Medical Studies in Kalamazoo, MI from 1989-1993. Afterwards, he completed a fellowship at the Hughston Sports Medicine Clinic in Columbus, GA. LaPrade received a Doctor of Philosophy degree from the University of Oslo, in Oslo, Norway, in 2003 based on his thesis about Posterolateral Knee Injuries.

Career 
LaPrade currently practices as an orthopedic surgeon at the Edina and Eagan locations of Twin Cities Orthopedics in Minnesota. As one of the world's most celebrated complex  knee  surgeons and clinician scientists, Dr. LaPrade has published more than 300 peer-reviewed scientific manuscripts, 100 book chapters, and has given over 1000 professional presentations, symposia, grand rounds, and instructional course lectures. He has received many awards for his research, including the OREF Clinical Research Award, considered a Nobel Prize of Orthopaedics and his research  team has been awarded the AOSSM Excellence in Research Award three times since 2009. In addition, he is the most published author in the top cited orthopaedic journal, the American Journal of Sports Medicine (AJSM), with over 115 articles in AJSM alone. He is also the sole author of the only comprehensive textbook on posterolateral knee injuries and has been the editor for several sports medicine textbooks. He is recognized as a pioneer in knee research, with many referrals from international and nationally recognized physicians due to his successful patient outcomes and his development of more effective surgical techniques for the reconstruction of complex knee injuries.

Additionally, he is on the Editorial Boards of the American Journal of Sports Medicine and Knee Surgery and Arthroscopy and Traumatology (KSSTA) Journals. Dr. LaPrade is known as one of the few specialists with extended expertise in the three main areas of medicine: clinical expertise, a lauded researcher, and an outstanding educator. Dr. LaPrade is recognized internationally as one of the top knee surgeons in the world. Often referred to as a "Doctor's doctor" he has specialized skills and expertise in diagnosing and treating complicated knee injuries and previously failed surgeries. He has treated athletes at all levels, including Olympic, professional (football, soccer, basketball, ice hockey, baseball, lacrosse, etc.), semi-professional and intercollegiate athletes and has returned many athletes back to full participation both after treating either their new injuries or previous failed knee surgeries. Dr. LaPrade has special expertise in treating posterolateral knee injuries, PCL tears, knee dislocations, revision ACL reconstructions, meniscal transplants, MCL injuries, knee osteotomies, fresh osteoarticular allografts, articular cartilage resurfacing procedures, complex patellofemoral instability, and other difficult combined and revision injuries.

Selected as "One of the Best Doctors in America" and "One of the Most Compassionate Doctors", Dr. LaPrade is passionate about treating sports medicine injuries and is recognized for his outstanding and specialized surgical skills. Dr. LaPrade is known as a super specialized clinician scientist who has utilized his vast and comprehensive research on sports medicine injuries to improve patient care and invent new ways to treat knee problems. Many of the surgeries that he has invented have been performed worldwide and are  recognized as the “Gold Standard”   for the treatment  of  many complex knee surgeries.

In addition, Dr. LaPrade is also recognized internationally as an outstanding teacher. His Vail International Complex Knee Course is considered to be the top international complex knee course and he has hosted several hundred sports surgeons who have observed his practice in Vail to learn his clinical exam and surgical techniques. He has been awarded several teaching awards, including  3 annual teaching awards given by the fellows at the Steadman Clinic Sports Medicine Fellowship program.

Hockey 
Additionally, he writes the "Hockey Doc" section of the Let’s Play Hockey magazine, contributing articles about hockey injury prevention and treatment.  LaPrade has treated injured athletes in all levels of competition, including professional and Olympic athletes, and was team physician for the University of Minnesota men's ice hockey team when they won two National Championships.

References

External links 
 DrRobertLaPradeMD.com

American sports physicians
Living people
Year of birth missing (living people)